John Parker (1548–1619) was an English politician.

He was a Member (MP) of the Parliament of England for Queenborough in 1571.

References

1548 births
1619 deaths
English MPs 1571